The following list of Carnegie libraries in Philadelphia provides detailed information on United States Carnegie libraries in Philadelphia, where 25 libraries were built from 1 grant (totaling $1,500,000) awarded by the Carnegie Corporation of New York on January 5, 1903.

Key

Carnegie libraries

See also

 List of Carnegie libraries in Pennsylvania

References

Further reading

Note: The above references, while all authoritative, are not entirely mutually consistent. Some details of this list may have been drawn from one of the references without support from the others.  Reader discretion is advised.

External links

Philadelphia
Public libraries in Pennsylvania
Buildings and structures in Philadelphia
Libraries
Libraries
Carnegie libraries